Donato Acquaviva d'Aragona (died 1528) was a Roman Catholic prelate who served as Bishop of Conversano (1499–1528).

Biography
In 1499, Donato Acquaviva d'Aragona was appointed during the papacy of Pope Alexander VI as Bishop of Conversano.
He served as Bishop of Conversano until his death in 1528.

References

External links and additional sources
 (for Chronology of Bishops) 
 (for Chronology of Bishops) 

15th-century Italian Roman Catholic bishops
16th-century Italian Roman Catholic bishops
Bishops appointed by Pope Alexander VI
1528 deaths